The women's 15 km individual biathlon competition of the Pyeongchang 2018 Olympics was held on 15 February 2018 at the Alpensia Biathlon Centre in Pyeongchang, South Korea. The race was originally set to be held on 14 February 2018, but high winds forced officials to reschedule the race for the following day.

Qualification

Schedule
All times are (UTC+9).

Results
The race was started at 17:15.

References

individual